Christopher "Chris" James Daniher (born 31 March 1966) is a former Australian rules footballer who played with the Essendon Football Club in the Australian Football League (AFL). His brothers Terry, Neale and Anthony also played for Essendon in the AFL.

Early life and childhood 
Chris was born the sixth child of James "Jim" Daniher and Edna Daniher (née Erwin) on 31 March 1966 at West Wyalong Base Hospital. Chris attended St Joseph's Catholic School, Ungarie for his primary education before going to Ungarie Central School until year ten, after which he became a farmer.

It was during his childhood that Chris showed his love for sport, namely Australian rules football, playing in the Northern Riverina Football League (NRFL) on Saturdays while playing rugby league at school carnivals. It was during his time in the NRFL that Chris won many best & fairest awards before he tore his anterior cruciate ligament in December 1984. After Chris recovered from this injury, he played for Ariah Park-Mirrool and later Coolamon in the Riverina Football League before he was approached by the Essendon Football Club to play for them in 1986.

VFL/AFL career 
From 1987-1997 Chris played for Essendon in the VFL/AFL, playing 124 games and playing in the 1990 and 1993 Grand Finals, the latter of which he won. He also made history alongside his brothers when they became the first quartet of brothers to play for the same team in a State of Origin match and in a home-and-away game. It was after the 1997 season that Chris retired.

Statistics

|-
|- style="background-color: #EAEAEA"
! scope="row" style="text-align:center" | 1987
|style="text-align:center;"|
| 7 || 2 || 0 || 1 || 5 || 8 || 13 || 5 || 3 || 0.0 || 0.5 || 2.5 || 4.0 || 6.5 || 2.5 || 1.5 || 0
|-
! scope="row" style="text-align:center" | 1988
|style="text-align:center;"|
| 7 || 2 || 1 || 0 || 16 || 6 || 22 || 8 || 4 || 0.5 || 0.0 || 8.0 || 3.0 || 11.0 || 4.0 || 2.0 || 0
|- style="background-color: #EAEAEA"
! scope="row" style="text-align:center" | 1989
|style="text-align:center;"|
| 7 || 3 || 1 || 2 || 24 || 7 || 31 || 9 || 2 || 0.3 || 0.7 || 8.0 || 2.3 || 10.3 || 3.0 || 0.7 || 0
|-
! scope="row" style="text-align:center" | 1990
|style="text-align:center;"|
| 7 || 5 || 1 || 0 || 41 || 24 || 65 || 11 || 19 || 0.2 || 0.0 || 8.2 || 4.8 || 13.0 || 2.2 || 3.8 || 0
|- style="background-color: #EAEAEA"
! scope="row" style="text-align:center" | 1991
|style="text-align:center;"|
| 7 || 9 || 1 || 2 || 69 || 79 || 148 || 15 || 30 || 0.1 || 0.2 || 7.7 || 8.8 || 16.4 || 1.7 || 3.3 || 0
|-
! scope="row" style="text-align:center" | 1992
|style="text-align:center;"|
| 7 || 19 || 10 || 5 || 189 || 148 || 337 || 85 || 49 || 0.5 || 0.3 || 9.9 || 7.8 || 17.7 || 4.5 || 2.6 || 3
|- style="background-color: #EAEAEA"
|style="text-align:center;background:#afe6ba;"|1993†
|style="text-align:center;"|
| 7 || 15 || 1 || 3 || 136 || 118 || 254 || 64 || 20 || 0.1 || 0.2 || 9.1 || 7.9 || 16.9 || 4.3 || 1.3 || 0
|-
! scope="row" style="text-align:center" | 1994
|style="text-align:center;"|
| 7 || 12 || 2 || 1 || 99 || 62 || 161 || 54 || 12 || 0.2 || 0.1 || 8.3 || 5.2 || 13.4 || 4.5 || 1.0 || 0
|- style="background-color: #EAEAEA"
! scope="row" style="text-align:center" | 1995
|style="text-align:center;"|
| 7 || 21 || 6 || 10 || 137 || 103 || 240 || 69 || 28 || 0.3 || 0.5 || 6.5 || 4.9 || 11.4 || 3.3 || 1.3 || 0
|-
! scope="row" style="text-align:center" | 1996
|style="text-align:center;"|
| 7 || 19 || 13 || 6 || 172 || 108 || 280 || 85 || 34 || 0.7 || 0.3 || 9.1 || 5.7 || 14.7 || 4.5 || 1.8 || 1
|- style="background-color: #EAEAEA"
! scope="row" style="text-align:center" | 1997
|style="text-align:center;"|
| 7 || 17 || 4 || 4 || 137 || 103 || 240 || 62 || 34 || 0.2 || 0.2 || 8.1 || 6.1 || 14.1 || 3.6 || 2.0 || 3
|- class="sortbottom"
! colspan=3| Career
! 124
! 40
! 34
! 1025
! 766
! 1791
! 467
! 235
! 0.3
! 0.3
! 8.3
! 6.2
! 14.4
! 3.8
! 1.9
! 7
|}

Retirement and beyond 
Shortly after retiring, Chris decided to return to Ungarie to become a farmer. After returning, Chris was approached by several clubs in the Riverina Football League (RFL) to play for them. Chris eventually decided to play with Temora for the 1998 and 1999 seasons.

After the 1999 season, Chris decided to play with Ungarie, which would award him with NRFL premierships in 2000 and 2001, as well as four NRFL and eight Ungarie best & fairest awards.

See also 
List of Australian rules football families

Further reading
 Daniher, Terry Daniher, Neale Daniher, Anthony Daniher and Chris Daniher. The Danihers: The Story of Football's Favourite Family. Sydney: Allen & Unwin, 2009.

References

External links

1966 births
Living people
Australian rules footballers from New South Wales
Essendon Football Club players
Essendon Football Club Premiership players
New South Wales Australian rules football State of Origin players
One-time VFL/AFL Premiership players